Vishesh Ravi is an Indian politician and member of the Aam Aadmi Party. He was elected to the Delhi Legislative Assembly from Karol Bagh constituency in the December 2013 elections, when he defeated Surendra Pal of the Bharatiya Janata Party. He has been elected three times consecutively to The Delhi Legislative Assembly (2013, 2015, 2020).

In year 2015, he was representing Government of NCT of Delhi at a conference held in Moscow, at the BRICS Youth Forum.

In year 2017, he attended the Indo-Pak Peace conference held in Dubai.

In 2017, he was also honored with the award of best MLA in Delhi Legislative Assembly.

On 1 February 2017, Ravi got married in a mass community wedding at the Shri Guru Ravidas Vishram Dham Temple where 8 couples were married in one day.

He was tested COVID-19 positive in year 2020, during the first wave while serving the people of his constituency. And after conquering COVID-19 he also donated his COVID-19 Convalescent Plasma (CCP) to 93 year old ex-Air Force Marshal.

Early life 
Vishesh Ravi was born on 19 May 1983, Delhi. He got his primary education from Mussoorie Public School and further education from Delhi. Very soon in his life, from the age of 18 he was involved in social services under the guidance of his father K.C. Ravi.

At the age of 23, he started working for the betterment of homeless kids. He was associated with two NGOs Jamghat and Khoj which help in building shelter for the homeless. He participated in fund raisers and helped organize Street plays for homeless children. He also helped restore runaway and homeless kids.

Member of Legislative Assembly (2020 - present)
Since 2020, he is an elected member of the 7th Delhi Assembly.

Committee assignments of Delhi Legislative Assembly
 Member (2022-2023), Public Accounts Committee

Electoral performance

References 

Delhi MLAs 2013–2015
Living people
Delhi MLAs 2015–2020
Delhi MLAs 2020–2025
People from Karol Bagh
Year of birth missing (living people)
Aam Aadmi Party MLAs from Delhi